Manmohan Memorial Institute of Health Science or MMIHS is a medical college in Kathmandu, Nepal. It is affiliated to Tribhuvan University and CTEVT.

History 
The institute was founded in 2006 by Nepal Health Care Co-operative Limited (NEHCO-Nepal). Other than MMIHS, NEHCO-Nepal manages a community hospital named Manmohan Memorial Community Hospital too.

Programs 
The institute offers the following education programs—
 Master of Clinical Bio Chemistry (M.Sc.Cl.Biochem)
 Master of Public Health (MPH)
 Bachelor in Public Health (BPH)
 Bachelor in Pharmacy (BPharm)
 Bachelor of Science in Nursing (B.Sc.Nsg.)
 Bachelor in Nursing Science (BNS)
 Certificate in Nursing (Staff nurse)
 Certificate in General Medicine (HA)
 Certificate in Health lab (Lab Technician)
 Diploma in Pharmacy (D.Pharm)
 Certificate in Radiography (PCL Radiography)

References

External links 
 

Medical colleges in Nepal
Educational institutions established in 2006
2006 establishments in Nepal